Agra acutidens is a species of beetle in the family Carabidae. It was described by Stefano Straneo in 1965.

References 

Insects of South America
Lebiinae
Insects described in 1965